= Public health impacts of flooding in West Africa =

This is an Image of Swamping of lands caused by a flood

The public health impacts of flooding in West Africa refer to the physical, mental, and social health challenges that communities in Africa face as a result of heavy rainfall and swamping in certain areas. In Africa, flooding accounts for over 20,000 deaths annually and causes socioeconomic challenges, adversely affecting approximately 20 million people. Due to this reason, the public health impact of flooding constitutes a major challenge in Africa.

Overview:

Flooding is a natural or man-made event caused by the accumulation of excessive water which leads to the submerging of areas, causes damage to properties and infrastructure, and poses threats to the lives of humans and animals.

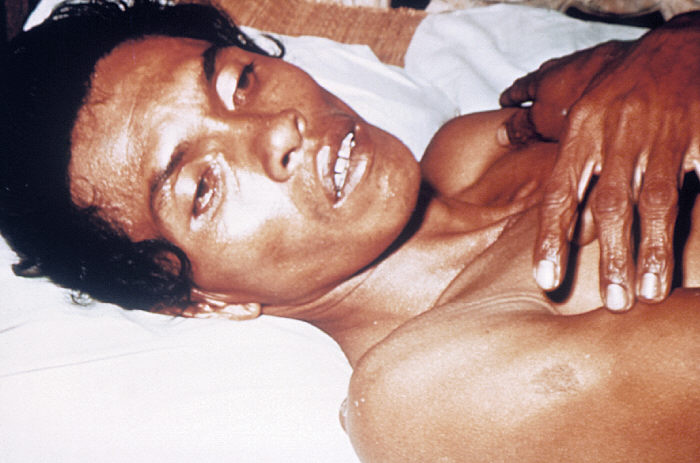
This is a person with cholera which is part of the infectious diseases caused by flooding

Health Implications of Flooding:

The health implications of flooding are quite diverse and occur either directly or indirectly through injuries from debris, chemical contamination, drowning, damage to ecosystems, and damage to infrastructure, food, and water supplies. They can be classified as immediate, occurring when the floodwater is still present; medium-term, occurring within days to weeks after a flood; and long-term, which often occur from months to years, long after the floodwater might have receded. Flooding significantly damages critical healthcare infrastructure and hinders the provision of healthcare services or limits access to healthcare services due to damaged roads or bridges. Flooding increases the chances of waterborne diseases such as cholera because it carries pathogens into potable water systems. Vector-borne diseases like malaria, Rift Valley fever, and West Nile fever usually increase after a flood. Rodent-borne diseases are known to increase during periods of heavy rainfall due to increases in grasses and seed sediments. Flooding leads to physical health problems such as cuts, injuries, and malnutrition.

Efforts:

It is necessary for governments across Africa to incorporate flood management as part of their national disaster preparedness, response, and mitigation
